Maafeh Neii is a 2010 family drama film directed and produced by Ali Seezan. Produced under Cxanal Movies, the film stars Seezan, Niuma Mohamed and Koyya Hassan Manik in pivotal roles. The film was released on 9 March 2010.

The film focuses on three generations of one family. It highlights many social issues, such as the human rights abuses, forced marriages and domestic violence. The entire film is shot at B. Kamadhoo. The font design used in the posters of film caused confused the audience with a title Maadeh Neiy which has no native meaning. A similar naming issue ensued in a previous venture of director in Karuna Vee Beyvafa (2009).

Cast 
 Niuma Mohamed as Seema
 Ali Seezan as Nawal
 Koyya Hassan Manik as Naseer
 Roanu Hassan Manik as Mohamed Fulhu
 Arifa Ibrahim as Abidha
 Lufshan Shakeeb as Hamza
 Nashidha Mohamed as Fazaa
 Aminath Ameela as Rizna
 Hamdhan Farooq as Mafaaz

Release and response
The film was criticised for its melodrama. A reviewer from Haveeru Daily praised the cinematography and inclusion of several social issues in the film simultaneously dissatisfied with its "ornate" dialogues and "unrealistic" makeup in special effects. Similar to the mixed reviews from critics, the film did average business at box office.

Soundtrack
The soundtrack album of the film was composed by Ibrahim Zaid Ali and Ayyuman Shareef while the lyrics were penned by Mohamed Abdul Ghanee and Ismail Mubarik.

Accolades

References

2010 films
Maldivian drama films
Films directed by Ali Seezan
2010 drama films
Dhivehi-language films